Year 1547 (MDXLVII) was a common year starting on Saturday (link will display the full calendar) of the Julian calendar.

Events

January–June 
 January 8 – The first Lithuanian-language book, a Catechism (Simple Words of Catechism), is published in Königsberg by Martynas Mažvydas.
 January 13 – Henry Howard, Earl of Surrey is sentenced to death for treason in England.
 January 16 – Grand Duke Ivan IV of Muscovy becomes the first Tsar of Russia, replacing the 264-year-old Grand Duchy of Moscow with the Tsardom of Russia.
 January 28 – King Henry VIII of England dies in London, and is succeeded by his 9-year-old son Edward VI, as King of England.
 February 20 – Edward VI of England is crowned at Westminster Abbey.
 March 31 – King Francis I of France dies at the Château de Rambouillet and is succeeded by his eldest surviving son Henry II (on his 28th birthday) as King of France.
 April 4 – Catherine Parr, widow of King Henry VIII of England, secretly marries Thomas Seymour, 1st Baron Seymour of Sudeley.
 April 24 – Battle of Mühlberg: Emperor Charles V defeats the Lutheran forces of the Schmalkaldic League.

July–December 
 August 13 – The Duchy of Brittany unites with the Kingdom of France.
 September 10
 Battle of Pinkie Cleugh: An English army under the Duke of Somerset, Lord Protector of England, defeats a Scottish army under James Hamilton, 2nd Earl of Arran, the Regent. The English seize Edinburgh.
 Conspirators led by Ferrante Gonzaga murder Pier Luigi Farnese, Duke of Parma and son of the Pope, and hang his body from a window of his palace in Piacenza.

Date unknown 
 Huguenots increasingly immigrate to the English county of Kent, especially Canterbury, from France.
 The Chambre Ardente is established in Paris for trying heretics.
 Work on construction of the Château de Chambord, in the Loire Valley, for Francis I of France, ceases.
 John Dee visits the Low Countries, to study navigation with Gemma Frisius.
 Edward VI of England outlaws execution by boiling.

Births 

 January 15 – Duchess Hedwig of Württemberg, by marriage countess of Hesse-Marburg (d. 1590)
 January 20 – Laurence Bruce, Scottish politician (d. 1617)
 January 24 – Joanna of Austria, Grand Duchess of Tuscany, Austrian Archduchess (d. 1578)
 February 8 – Girolamo Mattei, Italian Catholic cardinal (d. 1603)
 February 18 – Bahāʾ al-dīn al-ʿĀmilī, Syrian Arab co-founder of the Isfahan School of Islamic Philosophy (d. 1621)
 February 24 – Don John of Austria, military leader (d. 1578)
 March 1 – Rudolph Goclenius, German philosopher (d. 1628)
 March 26 – Bernardino Bertolotti, Italian instrumentalist and composer (d. 1609)
 April 8 – Lucrezia Bendidio, noblewoman and singer in Renaissance Ferrara (d. 1584)
 May 15 – Magnus Pegel, German mathematician (d. 1619)
 May 19 – Gustaf Banér, Swedish nobleman and member of the Privy Council of Sweden (d. 1600)
 June 28 – Cristofano Malvezzi, Italian organist and composer (d. 1599)
 July 5 – Garzia de' Medici, Italian noble (d. 1562)
 August 10 – Francis II, Duke of Saxe-Lauenburg (d. 1619)
 September 10 – George I, Landgrave of Hesse-Darmstadt (d. 1596)
 September 14 – Johan van Oldenbarnevelt, Dutch statesman (d. 1619)
 September 22 – Philipp Nicodemus Frischlin, German philologist and poet (d. 1590)
 September 20 – Faizi, Indo-Persian poet and scholar (d. 1595)
 September 29 – Miguel de Cervantes, Spanish fiction writer (d. 1616)
 October 2 – Philipp Ludwig, Count Palatine of Neuburg (1569-1614) and Count Palatine of Sulzbach (1604-1614) (d. 1614)
 October 18 – Justus Lipsius, Flemish humanist (d. 1606)
 October 29 – Princess Sophia of Sweden, Swedish princess (d. 1611)
 November 7 – Rudolf Hospinian, Swiss writer (d. 1626)
 November 10 
 Martin Moller, German poet and mystic (d. 1606)
 Gebhard Truchsess von Waldburg, Archbishop of Cologne (d. 1601)
 November 12 – Claude of Valois, daughter of King Henry II of France (d. 1575)
 November 26 – Nicolaus Taurellus, German philosopher and theologian (d. 1606)
 December 5 – Ubbo Emmius, Dutch historian and geographer (d. 1625)
 December 15 – Magdalena of Nassau-Dillenburg, German noblewoman (d. 1633)
 date unknown
 Matteo Perez d'Aleccio, Italian painter (d. 1616)
 Mateo Alemán, Spanish novelist and man of letters (d. 1609)
 Peter Bales, English calligrapher (d. 1610)
 Louis Carrion, Flemish humanist and classical scholar (d. 1595)
 Oichi, Japanese noblewoman (d. 1583)
 Krzysztof Mikołaj "the Thunderbolt" Radziwiłł, Polish nobleman (d. 1603)
 Richard Stanihurst, English translator of Virgil (d. 1618)
 Roemer Visscher, Dutch writer (d. 1620)
 Stanisław Żółkiewski, Polish nobleman (d. 1620)

Deaths 

 January 5 
 Albrecht VII, Duke of Mecklenburg (b. 1486)
 Johann Heß, German theologian (b. 1490)
 January 16 – Johannes Schöner, German astronomer and cartographer (b. 1477)
 January 18 – Pietro Bembo, Italian cardinal and scholar (b. 1470)
 January 19 – Henry Howard, Earl of Surrey, English nobleman, politician and poet, beheaded (b. c.1517)
 January 27 – Anne of Bohemia and Hungary, Queen consort of the Romans, Bohemia and Hungary (b. 1503)
 January 28 – King Henry VIII of England (b. 1491)
 February 25 – Vittoria Colonna, marchioness of Pescara (b. 1490)
 February 28 – Philippa of Guelders, Duchess of Lorraine (b. 1467)
 March 31 – King Francis I of France (b. 1494)
 April 11 – Dorothea of Denmark, Duchess of Prussia, Danish princess (b. 1504)
 May 22 – Daniel, Metropolitan of Moscow (b. c. 1492)
 c. May – Edward Hall, English chronicler and lawyer (b. c.1496)
 June 21 – Sebastiano del Piombo, Italian painter (b. 1485)
 July 20 – Beatus Rhenanus,  German humanist and religious reformer (b. 1485)
 August 7 – Saint Cajetan, Italian priest and saint (b. 1480)
 August 17 – Katharina von Zimmern, Swiss sovereign abbess (b. 1478)
 September 10 – Pier Luigi Farnese, Duke of Parma (b. 1503)
 September 17 – Frederick II of Legnica, Duke of Legnica from 1488 (until 1495 and 1505 with his brothers) (b. 1480)
 October 18 – Jacopo Sadoleto, Italian Catholic cardinal (b. 1477)
 December 2 – Hernán Cortés, Spanish conquistador of Mexico (b. 1485)
 December 28 – Konrad Peutinger, German humanist and antiquarian (b. 1465)
 date unknown
 Jörg Breu the Younger, German painter (b. 1510)
 Meera (Mirabai), Rajput princess (b. 1498)
 Photisarath, King of Laos (b. 1501)

References